IPPC can mean:

 International Plant Protection Convention
 Integrated Pollution Prevention and Control
 International Public and Political Communication, an Academic Programme at the University of Sheffield